Institut national des langues et civilisations orientales, abbreviated as INALCO, is a French university specializing in the teaching of languages and cultures from the world. Its coverage spans languages of Central Europe, Africa, Asia, America, and Oceania.

It is also informally called  Langues’O, an abbreviation for Langues orientales.

History 
 1669 Jean-Baptiste Colbert founds the École des jeunes de langues language school
 1795 The École spéciale des langues orientales (Special School for Oriental Languages) is established
 1873 The two schools merge
 1914 The school is renamed the École nationale des langues orientales vivantes (ENLOV)
 1971 The school is renamed the Institut national des langues et civilisations orientales or Inalco (National Institute for Oriental Languages and Civilizations)
 1982 Études Océan Indien (Indian Ocean Studies) journal begins publication; 
 1985 Inalco is recognized as a grand établissement
 2010 Inalco becomes a founding member of Sorbonne Paris Cité
 2011 Inalco centralizes all of its taught courses under one roof at 65 rue des Grands Moulins in Paris

Teaching and research

Courses

The undergraduate, graduate and continuing education courses offered at Inalco allow students to gain:
 mastery of a language and a thorough knowledge of the corresponding civilization over a degree program;
 specific expertise to complement other qualifications.
These courses lead to career paths in international business, international relations, communication and intercultural training, language teaching and multilingual computing.

 Bachelor's degrees: courses by language and region that can include a professional specialization.
 Master's degrees: regional programs targeting a research discipline or professional direction.
 Doctorate: PhD research at Inalco's Doctoral School.
 Diplomas: certificates, introductory diplomas, language and civilization diplomas, professional master's degrees.

Success and failure

Compared to other French universities, many programs at INALCO show high failure rates, i.e. high proportions of students failing the course in their end-of-year exam. This is particularly true among students specializing in Japanese, Chinese, Korean, Russian and Arabic, historically the largest departments of INALCO.

As an example,  with approximate student numbers, indicating rates of success and failure in the first, second and third year of the Department of Japanese Studies.

An explanation sometimes given is the difficulty of these courses, or the high level required by INALCO. A more likely cause is the absence of any entrance examination: any student can register in any course, regardless of their true motivation or academic level. Many students select a language out of a superficial interest in a country or culture, or due to individual connections, yet without the commitment to thoroughly learning those difficult languages. This issue is particularly acute for first and second year students; those who reach the third year are much more motivated, and thus show much higher rates of success.

Research 

Research at Inalco combines area studies and academic fields. Researchers study languages and civilizations that are increasingly in the spotlight – Africa, the Middle East, Asia, and as far as the Arctic – and are central to the major issues of the 21st century. Fourteen research teams, often partnered with other research organizations, PhD programs, and a publishing service form the backbone of research at Inalco. Inalco also has a project management and knowledge transfer service.

The research teams, administration offices and doctoral school are housed in a building dedicated entirely to research, with access to a full range of support functions: assistance in preparing research proposals and grant applications, organizing scientific events, looking for partnerships and funding, publication support, internal funding, and communication.

 270 faculty members
 300 PhD students
 14 research teams
 100 scientific events per year

Presidents (from 1914 to 1969, Administrators)

International 

Inalco conducts research projects in over one hundred countries and offers joint programs with foreign universities. This allows Inalco students and the students of international partners to complement their studies with an immersion experience. Inalco offers distance courses via videoconferencing and online learning
content: Inuktitut (Inuit language), Estonian, and soon Swahili (African language).

Inalco is an active member of Sorbonne Paris Cité, with 120,000 students, 8,500 faculty members, and 6,000 technical and administrative staff. Branches have been opened in Singapore, Buenos Aires and São Paulo.

The foundation strives to develop the preservation, study, transmission, development and interaction of languages and cultures in France and around the world with projects involving the institute's expertise: education, research, advancing knowledge and skills in a globalized world.

More than 120 nationalities are represented by Inalco faculty and students. The institute, along with its teachers, students and partners, organizes over a hundred cultural events a year. Inalco also participates in several international film festivals and makes every effort to share its knowledge and expertise with society.

Notable professors and alumni

 Doris Bensimon 
 Luce Boulnois
 Louis-Jacques Bresnier
 Marianne Bastid-Bruguière
 Auguste Carrière
 Léon Damas
 Luc-Willy Deheuvels
Bernard Faure
 Edgar Faure
 François Godement
 Heinrich Leberecht Fleischer
 Henrik, Prince Consort of Denmark
 Princess Maria Laura of Belgium, Archduchess of Austria-Este
 Iaroslav Lebedynsky
 Pierre Messmer
 Jean-Jacques Origas
 Trinidad Pardo de Tavera
 Patrick Poivre d'Arvor
 Dagpo Rinpoche
 Olivier Roy
 Léopold de Saussure
 Aurélien Sauvageot
 Johann Gustav Stickel
 Princess Fawzia-Latifa of Egypt
 Jonathan Lacôte, French Ambassador to Armenia
 Nicole Vandier-Nicolas

See also
 Colonial School, Paris

References

External links

Inalco official website
Alumni website

Langues et civilisations orientales, Institut national des
Langues et civilisations orientales, Institut national des
1795 establishments in France
13th arrondissement of Paris
Research institutes of Sinology